La Samaritaine (French pronunciation: [la samaʁitɛn]) is a large department store in Paris, France, located in the first arrondissement. The nearest métro station is Pont-Neuf, directly in front at the quai du Louvre and the rue de la Monnaie. The company was owned by Ernest Cognacq and Marie-Louise Jaÿ who hired architect Frantz Jourdain to expand their original store. It started as a small apparel shop and expanded to what became a series of department store buildings with a total of 90 different departments. It has been a member of the International Association of Department Stores from 1985 to 1992.

It is currently owned by LVMH, a luxury-goods maker. The store, which had been operating at a loss since the 1970s, was closed in 2005 purportedly because the building did not meet safety codes. Plans for redeveloping the building involved lengthy complications, as the representatives of the store's founders argued with new owners LVMH over the building's future as a department store or a mixed-use development. After seven years of renovation, it has reopened to public on 23 June 2021, having been previewed by the French President Emmanuel Macron journalists the days before. Its retail offerings targeted at affluent consumers, restaurants, and a boutique hotel that includes a penthouse suite with its own private swimming pool. The building has been listed since 1990 as a monument historique by the French Ministry of Culture.

Construction history 

Architect Frantz Jourdain was originally hired to assist in the remodeling and expansion of the existing store building, known as Magasin 1. However, as the store's success continued to grow, Cognacq decided to expand into a building across the street, Magasin 2, which became the site for the Samaritaine as designed by Jourdain. The construction of the building was done in stages, partly because the store had to continue to remain open in order to bring in revenue. Much of the building was brought to the site prefabricated, allowing the construction to occur rapidly. The building was proposed in 1905 and after five years of construction, the building, filling the entire block from rues de la Monnaie, Arbre-Sec, des Petres, and Baillet, was complete in 1910. The original store, Magasin 1, was eventually updated with a steel and glass structure to match Magasin 2, which was located across the street.

By the time the department store was completed in 1910, new movements, such as Fauvism, Cubism, and Werkbund, had come about and devalued the style of the Samaritaine. In the 1920s, Cognacq requested for expansions of the department store. City officials allowed for the expansions with the stipulation that Cognacq follow their specifications which centered around the utilization of a more current architectural style. This was done with little opposition as both Cognacq and Jourdain were aware that the original style of the building was outdated. During this reconstruction and expansion phase, the glass domes and decorative ironwork were removed. The new addition was a collaboration between architects Jourdain and Henry Sauvage, completed between 1926 and 1928, which featured cream colored stone and was of the Art Deco style. Similar to the original building in that it made use of the exposed steel however, its focus was much more geometry-based. At the end of construction, the Samaritaine eventually consisted of four different Magasins of department stores reaching eleven stories in total.

La Samaritaine was bought in 2001 by LVMH, the luxury-goods company that had just previously purchased Le Bon Marché. On 15 June 2005, in order to update the 19th-century building to modern standards of security, or for purposes of restructuring, as the labor unions believe, the department store was closed. LVMH selected the Japanese architectural firm SANAA to renovate the building. Implementation of the new design has been blocked a number a times by local authorities for failure to adhere to planning requirements and for lack of visual compatibility with the surrounding buildings. In June 2015, one of the Rivoli building permit is finalized and in September of the same year construction began. This modern construction of the Samaritaine is designed to feature a hotel, restaurant, a brewery, cafes, offices, and housing and was projected to be complete in 2019. However, the renovated building did not actually reopen until June 2021.

Design 

Jourdain's membership in multiple societies heavily influenced his personal architectural theory and design choices for the Samaritaine. Jourdain was the president of the Societe du Nouveau during the height of the Art Nouveau movement. The building's original design heavily embodies the ideals of this artistic style. While the skeletal structure of the department store is constructed of steel and glass, the building contains many applied adornments which lessen the harshness of its rigid structure. The building's exterior has two domes made of glass brick that light up in the nighttime. The extended verticals of the domes, sectioned into eight sides, accentuate the height of the building and draw the viewer's eye to the top of the store. The facade of the building consists of ceramic panels in brightly colored hues of yellow, white, green, and gold. The word "Samaritaine", as well as some of the available merchandise and ware, are displayed around the facade of the building in colorful enamel using an elaborate lettering. Dispersed around these signs are colorful naturalistic flower motifs, which continue to the interior design of the building as well. The interior features decorative iron staircases, glass tile floors, and frescoes using the repeated floral motif. These elements encompass both ornament and  functionality which are core principles of the Art Nouveau movement. The foundational ideas of Art Nouveau, and the Samaritaine, led the way to the modern movements of the 1920s.

The department store as a type and consumerism 
The main fundamental difference that distinguishes the department store from other stores is its offering of low-priced, mass-produced goods of a wide variety. Prices were able to be placed just slightly above wholesale as the volume of sales was able to compensate for the small margin. Typically, department stores are located centrally within a city and are in close proximity to transportation. Different department stores targeted people of different class distinctions. However, their main audience is the middle-class city dwellers who were highly conscious of their status. The Samaritaine, in particular, targeted the working class who constantly traveled through the first arrondissement for work. The goal of the department store is to move the consumer through the building and to its upper floors in order to maximize the number of counters an individual has to pass. This posed as a bit of a challenge as their target audience was so used to shopping along the street level at various small boutiques. Architects had to entice these shoppers by utilizing grand and decorative elements to allure consumers to explore the building.

Features 
The department store is constantly changing to keep up with the architectural trends, yet remains somewhat constant in its appearance as a building type. The design and decor of the building played a major role in enticing the human desire for the consumption of material goods. The common use of iron allowed for minimal skeletal structure and therefore maximized the amount of light that could flow through the interior and allowed more room for the circulation of customers. Many of the structural elements utilized reference to the international exhibition halls built a few years before the original department stores. Another common feature is the monumental stair design, a design element of the first department store, Bon Marche. It was later installed in the Samaritaine as well as other department stores constructed at the turn of the century. The Samaritaine also had the common department store design feature: the light court. The skeletal steel structure allowed for a maximum square footage of glass windows which was intentionally located at the center of the building to bring in ample natural light. The glazed corner rotunda became another crucial element of Parisian department store architecture. It served as a large space for display cases that could be seen by many pedestrians waiting on the street corner. The corner rotunda was also utilized as the entrance of the building, leaving the consumer with two options of vastly-stretching display windows upon entering the building. Finally, the use of a dome structure, and their strategic placement, was useful in identifying the department store as a type. The two domes of the Samaritaine create a sight line between the Seine and the left bank.

Consumerism 
The organization of each individual department within the stores is based on consumption patterns. For example, impulse items, such as jewelry and cosmetics, were placed on the street floor. This would encourage consumers to make quick impulse buys upon entering or right before leaving the store. Also, demand items, such as children's clothing or household goods, were located on the upper levels. This would force consumers to move past all of the lower level departments before they reached their desired location, maximizing the opportunity for the individual to make an unplanned purchase. Once the Samaritaine consisted of four Magasins, the first was dedicated as a department store solely for women's clothing while the other three were for items such as supplies and tools.

References

External links 

 Official website

Shops in Paris
Department stores of France
Retail buildings in France
Monuments historiques of Paris
Buildings and structures in the 1st arrondissement of Paris
LVMH brands
1869 establishments in France
Art Deco architecture in France
Art Nouveau architecture in Paris
Art Nouveau retail buildings
Commercial buildings completed in 1933